Live Oaks Square is a neighborhood within the city limits of Tampa, Florida. As of the 2010 census the neighborhood had a population of 2,005. The ZIP Code serving the neighborhood is 33610.

Geography
Live Oaks Square boundaries are roughly Hanna Avenue to the north, 40th Street to the east, Hillsborough Avenue to the south and 30th Street to the west.

Demographics
Source: Hillsborough County Atlas

At the 2010 census there were 2,005 people and 682 households residing in the neighborhood. The population density was  5,271/mi2. The racial makeup of the neighborhood was 8% White, 86% African American, 1% Native American, 1% Asian, 2% from other races, and 3.0% from two or more races. Hispanic or Latino of any race were 9%.

Of the 682 households 30% had children under the age of 18 living with them, 28% were married couples living together, 37% had a female householder with no husband present, and 5% were non-families. 24% of households were made up of individuals.

The age distribution was 28% under the age of 18, 23% from 18 to 34, 18% from 35 to 49, 17% from 50 to 64, and 15% 65 or older. For every 100 females, there were 84.5 males.

The per capita income for the neighborhood was $14,475. About 21% of the population were below the poverty line, including 17.0% of those under age 18 and 13.0% of those age 65 or over.

Transportation
The community is served primarily by three HARTline bus lines:

The following HARTline lines which serves the neighborhood:

Line 5 - Downtown Tampa to U.A.T.C. (via 40th Street)
Line 9 - Downtown Tampa to U.A.T.C. (via 30th Street)
Line 34 - Netpark to Town 'n' Country ''(via Hillsborough Avenue)

See also
Neighborhoods in Tampa, Florida

References

External links
Live Oaks Square profile and demographic information

Neighborhoods in Tampa, Florida